Sister Angelica (Spanish: Sor Angélica) is a 1954 Spanish drama film directed by Joaquín Luis Romero Marchent and starring Tilda Thamar, Marion Mitchell and Barta Barri.

The film's sets were designed by Miguel Lluch.

Cast
Josep Maria Angelat
Mercedes Barranco
Barta Barri 
Mario Bustos 
Manuel Gas
Miguel Gila
Luis Induni
Marion Mitchell
Rosa Moragas
Jaime Paloma
Rafael Romero Marchent
Tilda Thamar
Fernando Vallejo

References

External links

1954 drama films
Spanish drama films
Films directed by Joaquín Luis Romero Marchent
Films scored by Augusto Algueró
Spanish black-and-white films
1950s Spanish films
1950s Spanish-language films